Zsuzsanna Tálas (born ) is a Hungarian female volleyball player, playing as a setter. She is part of the Hungary women's national volleyball team.

She competed at the 2015 Women's European Volleyball Championship. On club level she used to play

-2015: Vasas SC Budapest.

2015 - 2017: BRSE Békéscsaba

2017 - 2018 : Trefl Proxima Kraków

2018 - : Linamar BRSE Békéscsaba

References

External links

1993 births
Living people
Hungarian women's volleyball players
Sportspeople from Székesfehérvár